Alfred Albert Martineau (18 December 1859 in Artins – 25 January 1945 in Varennes) was a notable historian and colonial administrator in the French Colonial Empire.

He wrote extensively on colonial affairs and the history of French colonial expansion, in particular a six-volume Histoire des colonies françaises et de l'expansion française dans le monde (1930–1934) co-authored with former French Foreign Minister Gabriel Hanotaux. Upon retirement from colonial service in 1921 he taught colonial history at the Collège de France until 1935.

Titles

See also
Colonial heads of Djibouti (French Somaliland)
List of colonial governors in 1899
List of colonial governors in 1900
Colonial heads of the Comoros
Colonial heads of Gabon

References

French colonial governors and administrators
École Nationale des Chartes alumni
1859 births
1945 deaths
People from Loir-et-Cher
Governors of French India
Colonial Governors of French Somaliland
Colonial Governors of French Gabon
People of the French Third Republic
Academic staff of the Collège de France